The 2019 Indian general election were held in India on 11 April and 23 April 2019 to constitute the 17th Lok Sabha.

Candidates 
Major election Candidates are:

Results

Assembly segments wise lead of Parties

References 

2019 Indian general election
2019 Indian general election by state or union territory
Elections in Tripura